The Shielding Shadow is a 1916 American action film serial directed by Louis J. Gasnier and Donald MacKenzie and starring Grace Darmond and Ralph Kellard.

Plot
The 15 chapter story involves the heroine being protected by a shadow with burning eyes. There's also a cloak of invisibility, some hypnotism and a giant octopus added to the mix.

Cast
 Grace Darmond as Leontine
 Ralph Kellard as Jerry Carson
 Léon Bary as Sebastian Navarro
 Madlaine Traverse as Barbara
 Lionel Braham as The Bouncer
 Frankie Mann as The Cabaret Singer
 Leslie King as One Lump Louie
 Hallen Mostyn
 Madeline Francine

Chapters
1. The Treasure Trove
2. Into the Depths
3. The Mystic Defender
4. The Earthquake
5. Through Bolted Doors 
6. The Disappearing Shadow
7. The Awakening
8. The Haunting Hand
9. The Incorrigible Captive
10. The Vanishing Mantle
11. The Great Sacrifice
12. The Stolen Shadow
13. The Hidden Menace
14. Absolute Black
15. The Final Chapter

Notes
Most of the chapters of this serial are lost with only chapters 4, 10, 11, 14 and 15 still remaining according to Treasures from the Film Archives by Ronald S. Magliozzi.

A French-American production, The Shielding Shadow was directly inspired by another silent movie serial, Judex - produced by Pathé Exchange's competitor Gaumont - whose first episode was titled The Mysterious Shadow. As Judex'''s release was delayed because of World War I, The Shielding Shadow was distributed in the United States before Judex. The Gaumont production, however, managed to be released in France before The Shielding Shadow (known in France as Ravengar''). Both films appear to have been inspirations for the American pulp character The Shadow, who wears a costume similar to Judex's and has a power of invisibility like The Shielding Shadow's protagonist.

References

External links

1916 films
1910s action films
American silent serial films
American black-and-white films
1910s English-language films
Films directed by Louis J. Gasnier
Pathé Exchange film serials
American action films
Silent action films
1910s American films